David Glen Harmon (January 2, 1921 – March 9, 2007) was a Canadian ice hockey defenceman who played for the Montreal Canadiens from 1942 to 1951. He was born in Holland, Manitoba and died in Mississauga, Ontario.

Playing career
Harmon's professional hockey career officially began on June 27, 1941 when he was acquired by the Montreal Canadiens from the Tulsa Oilers (AHA) through an inter-league draft; he would play for Montreal for the following 9 years, until his retirement from the NHL.

Harmon's first season as a Canadien, 1941–1942, was spent playing with the Montreal Senior Canadiens of the QSHL. It was in November 1942 when Harmon stepped onto the ice of the Montreal Forum to play in his first NHL game.

Harmon helped secure the Stanley Cup twice in his time with the Canadiens, first in the 1943-44 season and again in the 1945-46 season.

Harmon played his last four seasons with the Montreal Royals of the QHL.  At the end of the 1954–55 season, Harmon retired.

Awards and achievements
Turnbull Cup MJHL championship (1941)
Memorial Cup championship (1941)
Stanley Cup championships (1944 and 1946)
NHL Second All-Star Team (1945 and 1949)
Played in NHL All-Star Game (1949 and 1950)
"Honoured Member" of the Manitoba Hockey Hall of Fame
 Member of the Manitoba Sports Hall of Fame (2008)

Career statistics

References

External links

Glen Harmon's biography at Manitoba Hockey Hall of Fame

1921 births
2007 deaths
Canadian ice hockey defencemen
Ice hockey people from Manitoba
Brandon Elks players
Montreal Canadiens players
Stanley Cup champions
Winnipeg Rangers players
Canadian expatriates in the United States